The Western India Championships also known as the Western India Tennis Championships was a combined men's and women's tennis tournament , founded in 1888 as the Bombay Gymkhana Club Tournament. The championships was played at the Gymkhana Club grounds, Bombay, Maharashtra, India. The championships ran until 1980 before they was discontinued.

History
Tennis was introduced to India in 1880s by British Army and Civilian Officers. In 1888 the Western India Championships were founded as Bombay Gymkhana Club Tournament and played at the Bombay Gymkhana Club, Bombay, Maharashtra, India. In 1900 the tournament became known as the Western India Tournament, and 1912 it was officially named as the West India Championships. The championships were staged until 1980 when they were abolished.

In 1947, 1955 and 1959 this tournament was held in conjunction with the All India Hard Court Championships. It was also held jointly with  the Cricket Club of India tournament for the years 1970 and 1975.

Event names
 Bombay Gymkhana Club Tournament (1888-99)
 Western India Tournament (1900-11)
 Western India Championships (1912-80)

References

Defunct tennis tournaments in India
Clay court tennis tournaments
Grass court tennis tournaments